Delhi Colony is a neighbourhood near Clifton, Karachi.

References

External links 
 Karachi Website .

Neighbourhoods of Karachi